"Smile" is a dance single produced by Roger Sanchez, and written and recorded by British vocalist Sheila Gordhan. Released in November 2015, the digital downloaded single is the first number-one single for Gordhan in the United States, when it topped the Billboard Dance Club Songs chart in May 2016.

In an interview with Billboard, Gordhan reacted to the success of the single: "I'm over the moon! It's amazing to know that there's a lot of love for this record. It's a special track and I'm grateful to everyone for supporting it. It's definitely made me 'smile'!"

Track listing
 Digital download 
 Smile (Roger Sanchez Remix) 6:49  
 Smile (AM2PM Remix) 5:24  
 Smile (Deep Matter Remix) 5:55  
 Smile (House of Virus Remix) 5:06  
 Smile (Marc Baigent & Element Z Remix) 4:13  
 Smile (Ramsey & Fen Remix) 4:58

See also
 List of number-one dance singles of 2016 (U.S.)

References

External links
 Official site
 
  label

2015 songs
2015 singles
Dance-pop songs
House music songs